Below is a list of various national ice hockey team rosters of Russia. The men's, women's and the junior team are included.

Men's

2014 Winter Olympics

2010 World Championship

2010 Winter Olympics

Women's

2014 Winter Olympics

2010 Winter Olympics

Junior's

2010 World U18 Championship

References

Roster
Russia women's national ice hockey team